Now and Forever or Now & Forever may refer to:

Film and television 
 Now and Forever (1934 film), an American drama by Henry Hathaway
 Now and Forever, a 1953 Finnish film shot in the Philippines
 Now and Forever (1956 film), a British drama by Mario Zampi
 Now and Forever (1983 film), an Australian adaptation of the Danielle Steel novel (see below), by Adriane Carr 
 Now & Forever (2002 film), an American romance by Bob Clark
 Now and Forever (2006 film), a South Korean film by Kim Seong-joong
 Now and Forever (TV series), a 2005–2006 Philippine daytime drama

Literature
 Now and Forever (novel), a 1978 novel by Danielle Steel
 Now and Forever, a 1979 novel by Diana Palmer
 Now and Forever: Somewhere a Band Is Playing & Leviathan '99, a 2007 collection of stories by Ray Bradbury

Music

Albums 
 Now and Forever (Air Supply album) or the title song, 1982
 Now and Forever...Greatest Hits Live, by Air Supply, 1995
 Now and Forever (Donna Cruz album), 2016
 Now & Forever (Kim Wilde album) or the title song, 1995
 Now and Forever (Sister Sin album), 2012
 Now and Forever: The Hits, by TLC, and Now and Forever: The Video Hits, a video compilation, 2003
 Now & Forever – Best of Xandria or the 2005 title song (see below), 2008
 Now + 4eva, by Architecture in Helsinki, 2014
 Now & Forever, by Anne Murray or the 1986 title song (see below), 1994
 Now & Forever, by Color Me Badd, 1996
 Now and Forever, by the Lettermen, 1974
 Now and Forever, by Sattalites, 1995
 Now and Forever, by Triinu Kivilaan, 2008
 Now And Forever: The Ballads or the 1994 title song (see below), by Richard Marx, 2014

Songs 
 "Now and Forever" (Carole King song), 1992
 "Now and Forever" (Richard Marx song), 1994
 "Now and Forever (You and Me)", by Anne Murray, 1986
 "Now and Forever", by Barry Manilow and Sheena Easton from the film The Pebble and the Penguin, 1995
 "Now & Forever", by Drake from If You're Reading This It's Too Late, 2015
 "Now and Forever", by Hinoi Team, 2006
 "Now and Forever", by Vanilla Ice from Mind Blowin', 1994
 "Now & Forever", by Xandria from India, 2005

See also
 Ahora y Siempre (disambiguation)